Bravnice is a village in the municipalities of Jezero, Republika Srpska and Jajce, Bosnia and Herzegovina.

Demographics 
According to the 2013 census, its population was 323 with none living in the Jezero part.

References

Populated places in Jezero, Bosnia and Herzegovina
Populated places in Jajce
Villages in Republika Srpska